Petar Ivanov Shopov (born 14 January 1978) is a retired Bulgarian professional football striker.

Career
Shopov started his career playing with Levski Sofia however during the 1996–97 season he only made one official appearance in the Cup being loaned in the next season to Pirin Blagoevgrad, where he scored 10 goals in 25 games and became top scorer of the team. Soon he had a chance back at the Bulgarian giants Levski but after one season he returned to his previous club on loan again. But he will be back to the capital, in January 2000, this time to play in Slavia Sofia where he stayed for two years. Shopov's first adventure abroad was in January 2002, when he signed with Yugoslav top league club FK Železnik. In two years, he scored 12 goals. After spending another season in Sofia with Slavia again, he signed with the Slovenian club NK Mura where he played one season before returning to his first professional club Pirin in 2005. In 2006, he had a short spell in Kazakhstan first league club FC Kairat, before moving to Greece to play first in Kastoria F.C., where he became top scorer of the team and then in Anagennisi Karditsa. In the middle he had a stint in Cypros with Digenis Morphou. In the summer of 2009, Shopov returned to Bulgaria, signing a contract with Sportist Svoge. However, he left at the end of the year.

In 2010, Shopov signed a contract with West B PFG club Septemvri Simitli. He last played with Vihren in the West B PFG.

References

External links
 Petar Shopov at Playerhistory
 Stats at Soccerterminal
 Petar Shopov at BDFA. 

Living people
1978 births
Bulgarian footballers
Bulgarian expatriate footballers
OFC Pirin Blagoevgrad players
PFC Levski Sofia players
PFC Slavia Sofia players
FC Sportist Svoge players
First Professional Football League (Bulgaria) players
Kastoria F.C. players
Expatriate footballers in Greece
FK Železnik players
Expatriate footballers in Serbia and Montenegro
NK Mura players
Expatriate footballers in Slovenia
FC Kairat players
Expatriate footballers in Kazakhstan
Bulgarian expatriate sportspeople in Kazakhstan
Digenis Akritas Morphou FC players
Expatriate footballers in Cyprus
Association football forwards
Cypriot Second Division players
People from Bansko
Sportspeople from Blagoevgrad Province